Choline bitartrate is an organic compound with the chemical formula . It is a white crystalline powder with an acid taste. It is hygroscopic when exposed to air. Modern texts refer to the choline salt of the natural form of tartaric acid, that is, the salt called choline dextrobitartrate, choline (2R,3R)-bitartrate or choline L-(+)-bitartrate.

Chemistry
Choline bitartrate is a choline salt of tartaric acid. Choline bitartrate contains quaternary ammonium cations ((2-hydroxyethyl)trimethylammonium ) and bitartrate anions. Quaternary ammonium cation is a cation in which all four hydrogen atoms of ammonium are replaced with organyl groups. In the choline cation, the four substituents of ammonium are three methyl groups and one 2-hydroxyethyl group. The bitartrate anion is chiral (there are left, right and meso forms of bitartrate, see tartaric acid).

Production
Choline bitartrate can be produced by the chemical reaction of trimethylamine with ethylene oxide and water, followed by reaction with tartaric acid.

Uses
Choline bitartrate is used as a dietary supplement, a food additive, a nutrient and as a lipotropic compound. It is also used as a medication against bipolar disorder and mania (see: choline). Certain conducted double-blind, placebo-controlled studies of the effects of choline bitartrate treatment against Alzheimer-type dementias suggest improvement in some areas of patients' cognitive performance.

Safety
Choline bitartrate is flammable. Upon catching a fire, choline bitartrate may release toxic gases, like carbon monoxide (CO), carbon dioxide and nitrogen oxides (NO). May react violently with strong oxidizing agents.

The toxicity of this compound is similar to toxicity of choline itself, which is fairly low, and it is used as a dietary supplement. Oral LD50 value for a human is estimated to be 200 to 400 grams (as choline). Nevertheless, choline bitartrate can be harmful, if absorbed through skin. It may cause skin, eye and respiratory system irritation. May cause gastrointestinal system irritation as well. If swallowed in high doses, may cause dizziness, nausea, vomiting and diarrhea, and a rotten fish-like body smell resulting from the excretion of trimethylamine from the body (trimethylamine is a choline metabolite). There are reports of depression or increased symptoms of it in patients using high doses of choline bitartrate.  When choline bitartrate is used appropriately, hazardous effects are unlikely to occur.

References 

Tartrates
Quaternary ammonium compounds